Imperial Records, the second United Kingdom-based label of that name, went into business in 1920. It was owned by the Crystalate Gramophone Record Manufacturing Company Ltd. of Tonbridge, Kent, England. The company's main recording studio was in London.  Most Imperial issues were recorded by the company, but some issues from masters leased from other companies in continental Europe and from the United States' Banner Records which also appeared on Imperial. 

Most Imperial recordings were of popular songs, music hall tunes, and dance music of the time.  The label went out of business in February 1934.

A history of Imperial Records, together with a listing of known records issued by the label, is published by the CLPGS in their Reference Series of books.

See also
 List of record labels
 Imperial Records

References

British record labels
Record labels established in 1920
Record labels disestablished in 1934